Ocean by Ocean is the fifth album by The Boxer Rebellion, released on 29 April 2016. On 15 February 2016, they showcased two tracks to be taken from the album, "Keep Me Close", followed by "Big Ideas", the latter being the first single off the record.

When talking about "Big Ideas", Nathan Nicholson stated that "it's about meeting someone special but at the wrong time in your life. You feel lucky to have met them but also, because of the bad timing, like you have the very kind of worse luck."

In regards to "Keep Me Close", Nicholson said that it was "about the leap you take when you give yourself over, unwaveringly, to someone else. It's about letting yourself be judged, about being open to change to be closer to someone."

The last track of the album, "Let It Go", is a lament inspired by Nathan reading to his two-year-old son, and reminding himself of his place in the world.

Track listing

Charts

References

2016 albums
The Boxer Rebellion (band) albums